Catherine Mabwi (born ) is a Kenyan female volleyball player, and coach. She is currently the coach at Mpesa Foundation Academy.

She was part of the Kenya women's national volleyball team at the 1998 FIVB Volleyball Women's World Championship in Japan.

References

External links

1966 births
Living people
Kenyan women's volleyball players
Place of birth missing (living people)